Hugh A. Robertson (May 28, 1932 – January 10, 1988) was an American film director and editor, born in Brooklyn, of Jamaican parents. While Robertson was credited as an editor for only three films, Midnight Cowboy (directed by John Schlesinger-1969) earned him the BAFTA Award for Best Editing and a nomination for the Academy Award for Film Editing, making him the first African American person to be nominated for an Oscar in the editing category.

Robertson subsequently edited Gordon Parks' film Shaft (1971), which was his last credit as a film editor. By this time Robertson had turned to directing. In addition to television programs and documentaries, he directed the feature Melinda (1972). He spent most of his remaining life in Trinidad and Tobago. There he produced and directed the film Bim (1975) and ran a filmmaking school. He returned to the United States in 1986.

References

Further reading
 Editor Jim Clark also worked on Midnight Cowboy as a "creative consultant", and writes about the editing of the film in his 2012 memoir.

External links
 

African-American film directors
1932 births
1988 deaths
People from Brooklyn
Best Editing BAFTA Award winners
Film directors from New York City
American film editors
20th-century African-American people